North Carolina Highway 281 (NC 281) is a primary state highway in the U.S. state of North Carolina. The highway runs north–south, connecting communities in western Jackson County and scenic areas of southwest Transylvania County. It is the only North Carolina state highway that changes numbers when crossing into South Carolina.

Route description
NC 281 is a  two-lane mountain highway that begins at the South Carolina state line in Jackson County, before quickly entering Transylvania County. In South Carolina, the road continues south as SC 130. Continuing northwest, the highway becomes aggressively curvy, steep, narrow and in a couple of locations is a gravel road. NC 281 crosses back into Jackson County at Owens Gap (highest point on route), near Round Mountain to the northeast. The road widens again near the Tuckasegee River and passes by several lakes before ending in Tuckasegee.

The overall route shows the very best of what the Nantahala National Forest has to offer, but it is not recommended for commercial trucks, recreational vehicles or buses. In the winter, the highway can be considerably dangerous in snow and ice, and should not be attempted without proper equipment.

Scenic byways
Whitewater Way is a  byway from near Sapphire to the South Carolina state line. Various other falls can also be found along Horsepasture River and multiple trails connect the area with rare shortia found in the area. The byway is not recommended for recreational vehicles or buses.

History
NC 281 was established in 1930 as a new primary route, from NC 28, in Lake Toxaway, to NC 106, in Tuckasegee. In 1980, NC 281 was extended west along US 64 overlap, from Lake Toxaway to near Sapphire, and then along new primary routing to the South Carolina state line. Purpose of the route's extension was to connect visitors to the Whitewater Falls overlook area, maintained by the United States Forest Service. In January 1985, NC 281 was rerouted along Slick Fisher Road (SR 1306), north of Lake Toxaway; however in April of same year, NC 281 was reverted along its original routing. Around 1987, SC 130 was extended north from SC 11, near Salem, as a new primary routing to meetup with NC 281 at the state line; becoming the only non-continuous route number between the two states.

Junction list

References

External links

NCRoads.com: N.C. 281

281
Transportation in Jackson County, North Carolina
Transportation in Transylvania County, North Carolina